Li Chun (born 15 February 1988) is a Chinese actress, best known for her roles in television series as Ni Mantian and Wei Yanwan in The Journey of Flower (2015) and Ruyi's Royal Love in the Palace (2018) respectively, and has received critical acclaim for her film work, particularly as Qinhuainü in The Flowers of War and Lian Mei in Avalokitesvara.

Early life and education
Li Chun was born in Wuhu, Anhui, on February 15, 1988. She began to learn painting as a child. In 1998, at age 10, she was accepted to the Dance School Affiliated to Beijing Dance Academy and graduated in 2005. After graduation, she was hired to be a dancer at the Shanghai Ballet. In 2007 she performed in Butterfly Love in the United States. She entered Beijing Film Academy in 2009, majoring in acting, where she graduated in 2013.

Career
Li entered the entertainment circle in October 2010, while director Zhang Yimou attended the 60th anniversary school celebration of Beijing Film Academy and cast her in his film. Li made her film debut in The Flowers of War (2011), playing Qinhuainü.

In June 2012, she starred with Nakaizumi Hideo in the religious film Avalokitesvara, which was shown at the 37th Montreal World Film Festival in 2013.

Li had a supporting role as Su Qin in the family drama 80s Engagement (2013). She then played a supporting role in Zhang Yimou's film Coming Home. 

In 2015, she had a key supporting role in the fantasy romance television series The Journey of Flower, based on the 2009 novel of the same name by Fresh Guoguo. The series was a huge commercial success in China, with an average rating of 2.784% (CMS50) and 2.213% (nationwide), becoming the second highest rated drama of 2015. It also became the first Chinese drama to surpass 20 billion online views. The same year, she co-starred with Taiwanese actor Benjamin H. Wang in the romantic comedy film Eternal Love. 

In 2016, Li starred in the adventure suspense television series The Tibet Code. She also starred in the wuxia drama Huajinghu Buliangren based on the comic of the same name.

Li joined the main cast of crime suspense film Guilty of Mind (2017), based on the 2012 novel Picture of Psychological Crime by Lei Mi. The same year, Li played the concubine of Yang Yang's character in the fantasy romance film Once Upon a Time. 

In 2018, Li starred in the palace scheming drama Ruyi's Royal Love in the Palace, portraying one of the main antagonists.

In 2019, Li starred in the military drama Paratrooper Spirit; and featured in the historical political drama Joy of Life.

In 2020, Li starred in the period drama New World. The same year she starred in the female centric drama Love Yourself.  

She was cast in the wuxia drama Sword Snow Stride written by Wang Juan.

Filmography

Film

Television series

Discography

Awards and nominations

References

External links
 

 Li Chun on Douban   
 Li Chun on Metime 

1988 births
People from Wuhu
Beijing Film Academy alumni
Living people
Chinese film actresses
Chinese television actresses
21st-century Chinese actresses
Chinese ballerinas